Mohamed Abdelmawgoud (born 1 June 1994) is an Egyptian judoka. He competed in the men's 66 kg event at the 2020 Summer Olympics in Tokyo, Japan.

As per 25 April 2021, he is 4 times gold medallist en 6 times medallist on the African Judo Championships in the - 66 class.

References

External links
 

1994 births
Living people
Egyptian male judoka
Judoka at the 2020 Summer Olympics
Olympic judoka of Egypt
African Games medalists in judo
African Games bronze medalists for Egypt
Competitors at the 2018 Mediterranean Games
Competitors at the 2022 Mediterranean Games
Mediterranean Games gold medalists for Egypt
Mediterranean Games medalists in judo
Competitors at the 2019 African Games
21st-century Egyptian people